Newgate Street refers to:

Newgate and Newgate Street in London
Newgate Street, Hertfordshire, a village in Hertfordshire
Newgate Street, Newcastle, a shopping and entertainment street in Newcastle upon Tyne

See also
 Newgate (disambiguation)